Dolichopus aurifex is a species of long-legged fly in the family Dolichopodidae.

References

aurifex
Articles created by Qbugbot
Insects described in 1921